Ethel Caffie-Austin is an American musician. She is known as the First Lady of West Virginia Gospel music. She is a skilled pianist and teacher and features on a 2-DVD set called Learn to Play Gospel Piano on which she teaches the basics of gospel piano.

In 2020, she was admitted into the West Virginia Music Hall of Fame

References

External links
 A documentary film on the life of Ethel Caffie-Austin

20th-century American singers
20th-century American women singers
20th-century African-American women singers
Singers from West Virginia
Year of birth missing (living people)
Living people